Labiarón is one of four parishes (administrative divisions) in San Martín de Oscos, a municipality within the province and autonomous community of Asturias, in northern Spain.

Villages and hamlets
 Libiarón (Libiaróu)
 Piorno
 Sarcead (Sarciada)
 Solana (A Solá)
 Soutelo
 Testemuñas (Testimuñas)
 Villamea (Villamiá) 
 Villarín de Piorno (Vilarín de Piorno) 
 Villarpille (Vilarpille)

References

Parishes in San Martín de Oscos